Saad Al-Barrak is a Kuwaiti businessman, entrepreneur, and investor. Al-Barrak's career started as an engineer at International Turnkey Solutions where he was promoted to CEO after a five year tenure. Shifting ITS from a local player to a regional powerhouse. Al-Barrak is best known for his role as CEO of Zain Group where he turned Zain (formerly known as MTC) from a local telecom company with 500,000 users to an empire with 72 million users. Al-Barrak's leadership and expertise in change management was the element to Zain's success.

Saad Al-Barrak was born in the Farwaniyah District of Kuwait in the year 1955, the seventh of eleven brothers and five sisters, the son of Hamad Al-Barrak, treasurer to Helal Al-Mutairi, one of the most prominent pearl traders in the region. Al-Barrak studied at the Mubarakiyah school where he excelled in secondary school. Concurrently Al-Barrak was a gymnastics player at Kazma club. After successfully finishing high school, Al-Barrak was granted a scholarship to continue his education in The United States of America. Al-Barrak took an ESL course at Georgetown University in Washington D.C. and went to Ohio University afterward to study electrical engineering. Al-Barrak was a politically active student during his time at Ohio.

Career 

Al Barrak started his career with a short stint at Kuwait Prefab Industries, during a short break in between his Bachelors and master's degrees. After completion of his master's degree, he taught at the Kuwait Institute of Applied Technology as a part of the conditions of the government scholarship that he was given.
Upon being persuaded by an old friend, he joined ITS as a project engineer.
Within a year, he was put in charge of Project teams and sent on training courses to the UK and US. By the end of 1985 he was appointed as Systems Development Manager and in (months after that was promoted to Assistant Director General for Sales and Systems support. In 1987, he was appointed CEO of ITS, barely 4 years after he had joined them as a Project Engineer.
Al Barrak, resigned as CEO in 2001 and continued as managing director until 2002.
Mobile Telecommunications Co. (MTC) had just been divested by the government and been taken over by the Al Kharafi Group, and Al Barrak became managing director of MTC which later re-branded as Zain Group in 2002 until he resigned in February 2010.
He started ILA, an advisory firm in December 2010.

Awards 

 2003 - E-businessman of the year, Arabian Business e-achievement award
 2007 - Lifetime achievement award, Comms MEA
 2008 - Arab Ad man of the year, Arab Ad
 2008 - International Investor award, Africa Investor
 2008 - Telecom CEO of the year, CEO Middle East
 2008 - Visionary award, Bespoke
 2009 - Editor's Award for Individual Contribution to the telecoms industry, Global Telecoms Business
 2012 - Kuwaiti Business Man of the year, Arabian Business
 2012 - Outstanding contribution to Business, CEO Middle East

Bibliography

References

External links 
Tea with FT Middle East: Saad al-Barrak
TEDx Safat - Dr. Saad Al Barrak

People from Kuwait City
1955 births
Living people